Matt Regier is an American businessman and politician who serves as the Speaker of the Montana House of Representatives. He has represented the 4th district in the Montana House of Representatives as a Republican since 2017.

Early life and education 
Regier was born in Kalispell, Montana. Regier's father is Keith Regier, a member of the Montana Legislature. Regier's mother is Jolene Regier. In 2005, Regier earned a Bachelor of Science degree in business from University of Montana.

Career 
As a businessman, Regier is the owner of Stillwater Sod Corporation. Regier is also a real estate investor.

On November 8, 2016, Regier won the election and became a Republican member of Montana House of Representatives for District 4. Regier defeated Deborah Gentry with 77.17% of the vote. On November 6, 2018, as an incumbent, Regier won the election and continued serving District 4. Regier defeated Kwen Shirley with 75.80% of the vote. In 2023 he was elected Speaker of the Montana House of Representatives.

Personal life 
Regier and his family lived in Kalispell, Montana. Regier resides in Columbia Falls, Montana.

See also 
 Montana House of Representatives, District 4

References

External links 
 Matt Regier at ballotpedia.org
 Matt Regier at followthemoney.org
 Matthew Keith Regier at facebook.com
 Matt Regier at linkedin.com

21st-century American politicians
Living people
People from Columbia Falls, Montana
People from Kalispell, Montana
Politicians from Kalispell, Montana
Republican Party members of the Montana House of Representatives
Speakers of the Montana House of Representatives
University of Montana alumni
Year of birth missing (living people)